Craig Xavier Brockman (born May 16, 1973) is a hip hop and R&B record producer, arranger, keyboardist, and instrumentalist. He mostly works with Missy Elliott, Timbaland, Terrace Martin, Warren G. He is also a member of The Soul Seekers.

Production
 Madonna - "American Life (Missy Elliott American Dream Remix)" (produced with Missy Elliott)
 Blaque - "Ugly" (produced with Missy Elliott & CKB)
 Missy Elliott - "...So Addictive (Intro)" (produced with Missy Elliott)
 Missy Elliott - "Take Away" (produced by Timbaland, co-produced by Craig Brockman and Missy "Misdemeanor" Elliott)
 Tweet - "So Much To Say (Intro)"
 Tweet - "My Place" 
  
 Tweet - "Smoking Cigarettes" (produced with Tweet) 
 Tweet - "Best Friend" (produced with Tweet)
 Tweet - "Beautiful"
 Tweet - "Complain" (produced with Tweet)
 Tweet - "Heaven" (produced with Tweet & Timbaland)
 Tweet - "Drunk" (produced with Tweet)
 Missy Elliott - "Nothing Out There For Me (feat. Beyoncé)" (produced with Missy Elliott)
 Missy Elliott - "Can You Hear Me (feat. TLC)" (produced with Missy Elliott)
 Monica - "Get It Off (feat. Dirtbag)" (produced with Missy Elliott)
 Missy Elliott - "Irresistible Delicious (feat. (Slick Rick)"
 Missy Elliott - "Remember When" (produced with Missy Elliott)
 Missy Elliott - "Bad Man (feat. M.I.A. & Vybz Kartel)"
 K-Ci & JoJo - "HBI" (produced with Jo Jo Hailey & Mike Smoov)
 Tweet - "Intro (It's Me Again)"
 Tweet - "Iceberg" (produced with Tweet, Charlie Bereal)
 Tweet - "Cab Ride" 
 Tweet - "Things I Don't Mean" (produced with Missy Elliott, Charlie Bereal)
 Tweet - "My Man" (produced with Missy Elliott)
 Tweet - "Small Change" 
 Tweet - "Two Of Us"(produced with Charlie Bereal)
 Tweet - "I'm Done" 
 Tweet - "We Don't Need No Water" (produced with Missy Elliott, Kwamé), Spencer Proffer & Steve Plunkett)
 Beyoncé - "Signs" (produced with Missy Elliott)
 Missy Elliott - "Ragtime (Interlude)" (produced with Missy Elliott)
 Missy Elliott - "Dats What I'm Talkin About (feat. R. Kelly)" (produced with Missy Elliott)
 Missy Elliott - "Toyz" (produced with Missy Elliott & Timbaland)
 Missy Elliott - "It's Real" (produced with Missy Elliott)
 Missy Elliott - "I'm Not Perfect" (produced with Missy Elliott)
 Fantasia Barrino - "Free Yourself" (produced with Missy Elliott)
 Fantasia Barrino - "Good Lovin'" (produced with Missy Elliott)
 Timbaland & Magoo - "Voice Mail" (produced with Timbaland)
 Timbaland & Magoo - "Love Me (feat. Tweet)" (produced with Timbaland)
 Timbaland & Magoo - "Drop" (produced with Timbaland)
 Angie Stone - "U-Haul" (produced with Missy Elliott, Jubu)

References

1973 births
American male songwriters
Living people
African-American songwriters
American hip hop record producers
Musicians from Los Angeles
Songwriters from California
Record producers from California
21st-century African-American people
20th-century African-American people